Muthirai is a 2009 Indian Tamil-language action thriller film written by Aneez Tanveer Jeeva, wife of late director Jeeva, who also produces this film, and directed by actor Srinath, starring Daniel Balaji, Nithin Sathya, Lakshmi Rai and newcomer Manjari Phadnis, whilst Kishore of Polladhavan and Vennila Kabadi Kuzhu fame and Ponvannan play important supporting roles and Bollywood actress Rakhi Sawant makes a special appearance. The film, which has musical score by Yuvan Shankar Raja, was launched in early 2008, and was released on 19 June 2009.

Plot
Azhagar Adhiyaman's (Saravanan) party wins in Tamil Nadu Assembly elections. His brother Azhagar Thondaiman (Anand), the senior party leader Aadhikesavan (Ponvannan), and Azhagar Adhiyaman discuss about the posts to be held. Discussions turn into gun-firing, where all three of them get bullet shots. Azhagar Adhiyaman dies, Azhagar Thondaiman gets into a coma, and Aadhikesavan is left with an injury. The state is brought under temporary Governor's rule until their party chooses the new CM.

Sathya (Nithin Sathya) and his accomplice Azhagu (Daniel Balaji) are highly successful and petty thieves. Azhagu marries Kavyanjali (Lakshmi Rai) once for money (under the mass-marriage programme). Kavya's father (Cochin Hanifa) tries to make money with his daughter. Azhagu realizes his mistake and tries to convince Kavya. Sathya cheats Aarthi (Manjari Phadnis) by saying he is a CBI officer and makes her fall in love with him. Sathya and Azhagu stay in an apartment opposite to where Krishna (Chetan) stays.

The commissioner (Kishore) is appointed as the investigating officer for the case, and he finds that Krishna knows some information about the firing where Azhagar Adhiyaman was killed. He traces where Krishna stays and chases him. At the same time, in the opposite apartment, Sathya, Azhagu, and Aarthi host a birthday party for Kavya for Azhagu and Kavya to get together again. Krishna enters their house to escape from the police, and all five of them start running away from the police. While the police chases them, Azhagu, Kavya, Sathya, and Aarthi try to escape. Krishna also tries to get in the car and drops his laptop in their car.

Four of them flee and seek refugee in a hideout. They take out the laptop to find that Aadhikesavan has shot Azhagar Adhiyaman and his brother, and he shoots himself. Azhagu calls up the commissioner to hand over the witness, which fails because Aadhikesavan's men come and attack them in their hideout, and Azhagu thinks that it is the commissioner's men. Later, he calls Aadhikesavan and demands a ransom in exchange for the laptop. He also checks the commissioner's credit card transaction and mobile phone calls and finds that the commissioner has been getting a lot of money illegally from Azhagar Thondaiman, and he is appointed by him.

In the climax, Sathya comes to collect money from Aadhikesavan, where the commissioner also turns up unexpectedly. Azhagu comes with Azhagar Thondaiman, who was in the hospital. Azhagar Thondaiman explains his side of the story, that he also tried to kill his brother and had worn a bulletproof jacket to avoid the bulletproof. Krishna was a man appointed by him to take videos of incidents happening. The commissioner kills Aadhikesavan. When Sathya and Azhagu try to escape with the money, other police officers encounter them. They shoot the commissioner and arrest Azhagar Thondaiman. In the meantime, Sathya and Azhagu escape with the money and wish the other police officers good luck with their careers.

Cast
 Daniel Balaji as Azhagu
 Nithin Sathya as Sathyamoorthy
 Lakshmi Rai as Kavyanjali
 Manjari Phadnis as Aarthi
 Kishore as Commissioner
 Saravanan as Azhagar Adhiyaman
 Chetan as Krishna
 Ponvannan as Aadhikesavan
 Anand as Azhagar Thondaiman
 Riyaz Khan as Aadhikesavan's assistant 
 Cochin Hanifa as Kavya's father
 Rakhi Sawant in an item number "The Night is Still Young"

Soundtrack

The soundtrack was composed by Yuvan Shankar Raja and was released on 7 May 2009 at Sathyam Cinemas by director Gautham Vasudev Menon. It features 8 tracks overall, out of which 2 songs are remixes, which were composed by Aditya. Especially mentionable is the fact, that one of the female leads of the film, Manjari Phadnis, a Maharashtrian by birth, has sung one of the songs, the first time in her career. The lyrics were penned by Snehan, Na. Muthukumar and Pa. Vijay.

Reception
Behindwoods wrote, "Director Srinath knows his onions only too well and as a result, the racy story is further strewn with countless twists – some drab, but most of them surprisingly convincing fuelling the pace of the movie ensuring that there’s never a dull moment in the script." Rediff wrote: "Halfway through the film though, you begin to realize that despite a rather nice cast, comedian-turned-director Srinath seems to have lost track of whatever Hollywood screenplay he burglarised and settled down with a half-baked desi version."

References

External links 
 
 

2009 films
Indian action thriller films
2009 action thriller films
2000s Tamil-language films